Thermal energy storage (TES) is achieved with widely different technologies. Depending on the specific technology, it allows excess thermal energy to be stored and used hours, days, months later, at scales ranging from the individual process, building, multiuser-building, district, town, or region. Usage examples are the balancing of energy demand between daytime and nighttime, storing summer heat for winter heating, or winter cold for summer air conditioning (Seasonal thermal energy storage). Storage media include water or ice-slush tanks, masses of native earth or bedrock accessed with heat exchangers by means of boreholes, deep aquifers contained between impermeable strata; shallow, lined pits filled with gravel and water and insulated at the top, as well as eutectic solutions and phase-change materials.

Other sources of thermal energy for storage include heat or cold produced with heat pumps from off-peak, lower cost electric power, a practice called peak shaving; heat from combined heat and power (CHP) power plants; heat produced by renewable electrical energy that exceeds grid demand and waste heat from industrial processes. Heat storage, both seasonal and short term, is considered an important means for cheaply balancing high shares of variable renewable electricity production and integration of electricity and heating sectors in energy systems almost or completely fed by renewable energy.

Categories 

The different kinds of thermal energy storage can be divided into three separate categories: sensible heat, latent heat, and thermo-chemical heat storage. Each of these has different advantages and disadvantages that determine their applications.

Sensible heat storage 

Sensible heat storage (SHS) is the most straightforward method. It simply means the temperature of some medium is either increased or decreased. This type of storage is the most commercially available out of the three; other techniques are less developed.

The materials are generally inexpensive and safe. One of the cheapest, most commonly used options is a water tank, but materials such as molten salts or metals can be heated to higher temperatures and therefore offer a higher storage capacity. Energy can also be stored underground (UTES), either in an underground tank or in some kind of heat-transfer fluid (HTF) flowing through a system of pipes, either placed vertically in U-shapes (boreholes) or horizontally in trenches. Yet another system is known as a packed-bed (or pebble-bed) storage unit, in which some fluid, usually air, flows through a bed of loosely packed material (usually rock, pebbles or ceramic brick) to add or extract heat.

A disadvantage of SHS is its dependence on the properties of the storage medium. Storage capacities are limited by the specific heat capacity of the storage material, and the system needs to be properly designed to ensure energy extraction at a constant temperature.

Molten-salt technology 
The sensible heat of molten salt is also used for storing solar energy at a high temperature. It’s termed molten-salt technology or molten salt energy storage (MSES). Molten salts can be employed as a thermal energy storage method to retain thermal energy. Presently, this is a commercially used technology to store the heat collected by concentrated solar power (e.g., from a solar tower or solar trough). The heat can later be converted into superheated steam to power conventional steam turbines and generate electricity at a later time. It was demonstrated in the Solar Two project from 1995–1999. Estimates in 2006 predicted an annual efficiency of 99%, a reference to the energy retained by storing heat before turning it into electricity, versus converting heat directly into electricity. Various eutectic mixtures of different salts are used (e.g., sodium nitrate, potassium nitrate and calcium nitrate). Experience with such systems exists in non-solar applications in the chemical and metals industries as a heat-transport fluid.

It is then sent to a hot storage tank. With proper insulation of the tank the thermal energy can be usefully stored for up to a week. When electricity is needed, the hot molten salt is pumped to a conventional steam-generator to produce superheated steam for driving a conventional turbine/generator set as used in any coal, oil, or nuclear power plant.

Single tank with divider plate to hold both cold and hot molten salt, is under development. It is more economical by achieving 100% more heat storage per unit volume over the dual tanks system as the molten-salt storage tank is costly due to its complicated construction. Phase Change Material (PCMs) are also used in molten-salt energy storage, while research on obtaining shape-stabilized PCMs using high porosity matrices is ongoing.

Most solar thermal power plants use this thermal energy storage concept. The Solana Generating Station in the U.S. can store 6 hours worth of generating capacity in molten salt. During the summer of 2013 the Gemasolar Thermosolar solar power-tower/molten-salt plant in Spain achieved a first by continuously producing electricity 24 hours per day for 36 days. The Cerro Dominador Solar Thermal Plant, inaugurated in June 2021, has 17.5 hours of heat storage.

Proposals for nuclear reactors using this technology to be more economical load-following power plants have been made by TerraPower in their NATRIUM reactor design, and by MOLTEX with their GridReserve system.

Heat storage in tanks or rock caverns

A steam accumulator consists of an insulated steel pressure tank containing hot water and steam under pressure.  As a heat storage device, it is used to mediate heat production by a variable or steady source from a variable demand for heat. Steam accumulators may take on a significance for energy storage in solar thermal energy projects.

Large stores are widely used in Nordic countries to store heat for several days, to decouple heat and power production and to help meet peak demands. Interseasonal storage in caverns has been investigated and appears to be economical and plays a significant role in heating in Finland.
Helen Oy estimates an 11.6 GWh capacity and 120 MW thermal output for its  water cistern under Mustikkamaa (fully charged or discharged in 4 days at capacity), operating from 2021 to offset days of peak production/demand; while the  rock caverns  under sea level in Kruunuvuorenranta (near Laajasalo) were designated in 2018 to store heat in summer from warm seawater and release it in winter for district heating.

Hot silicon technology 

Solid or molten silicon offers much higher storage temperatures than salts with consequent greater capacity and efficiency. It is being researched as a possible more energy efficient storage technology. Silicon is able to store more than 1 MWh of energy per cubic metre at 1400 °C. An additional advantage is the relative abundance of silicon when compared to the salts used for the same purpose.

Molten silicon thermal energy storage is currently being developed by the Australian company 1414 Degrees as a more energy efficient storage technology, with a combined heat and power (cogeneration) output.

Molten aluminum 

Another medium that can store thermal energy is molten (recycled) aluminum. This technology was developed by the Swedish company Azelio. The material is heated to 600  °C. When needed, the energy is transported to a Stirling engine using a heat-transfer fluid.

Heat storage in hot rocks or concrete

Water has one of the highest thermal capacities at 4.2 kJ/(kg⋅K) whereas concrete has about one third of that. On the other hand, concrete can be heated to much higher temperatures (1200 °C) by for example electrical heating and therefore has a much higher overall volumetric capacity. Thus in the example below, an insulated cube of about  would appear to provide sufficient storage for a single house to meet 50% of heating demand. This could, in principle, be used to store surplus wind or solar heat due to the ability of electrical heating to reach high temperatures. At the neighborhood level, the Wiggenhausen-Süd solar development at Friedrichshafen in southern Germany has received international attention. Siemens-Gamesa built a 130 MWh thermal storage near Hamburg with 750 °C in basalt and 1.5 MW electric output. A similar system is scheduled for Sorø, Denmark, with 41–58% of the stored 18 MWh heat returned for the town's district heating, and 30–41% returned as electricity.

“Brick toaster” is a recently (august 2022) announced innovative heat reservoir operating at up to 1,500 °C (2,732 °F) that its maker, Titan Cement/Rondo claims should be able cut global  output by 15% over 15 years.

Latent Heat Storage 

Because Latent Heat Storage (LHS) is associated with a phase transition, the general term for the associated media is Phase-Change Material (PCM). During these transitions, heat can be added or extracted without affecting the material’s temperature, giving it an advantage over SHS-technologies. Storage capacities are often higher as well.

There are a multitude of PCMs available, including but not limited to salts, polymers, gels, paraffin waxes and metal alloys, each with different properties. This allows for a more target-oriented system design. As the process is isothermal at the PCM’s melting point, the material can be picked to have the desired temperature range. Desirable qualities include high latent heat and thermal conductivity. Furthermore, the storage unit can be more compact if volume changes during the phase transition are small.

PCMs are further subdivided into organic, inorganic and eutectic materials. Compared to organic PCMs, inorganic materials are less flammable, cheaper and more widely available. They also have higher storage capacity and thermal conductivity. Organic PCMs, on the other hand, are less corrosive and not as prone to phase-separation. Eutectic materials, as they are mixtures, are more easily adjusted to obtain specific properties, but have low latent and specific heat capacities.

Another important factor in LHS is the encapsulation of the PCM. Some materials are more prone to erosion and leakage than others. The system must be carefully designed in order to avoid unnecessary loss of heat.

Miscibility gap alloy technology  
Miscibility gap alloys  rely on the phase change of a metallic material (see: latent heat) to store thermal energy.

Rather than pumping the liquid metal between tanks as in a molten-salt system, the metal is encapsulated in another metallic material that it cannot alloy with (immiscible).  Depending on the two materials selected (the phase changing material and the encapsulating material) storage densities can be between 0.2 and 2 MJ/L.

A working fluid, typically water or steam, is used to transfer the heat into and out of the system.  Thermal conductivity of miscibility gap alloys is often higher (up to 400 W/(m⋅K)) than competing technologies which means quicker "charge" and "discharge" of the thermal storage is possible.  The technology has not yet been implemented on a large scale.

Ice-based technology

Several applications are being developed where ice is produced during off-peak periods and used for cooling at a later time. For example, air conditioning can be provided more economically by using low-cost electricity at night to freeze water into ice, then using the cooling capacity of ice in the afternoon to reduce the electricity needed to handle air conditioning demands. Thermal energy storage using ice makes use of the large heat of fusion of water. Historically, ice was transported from mountains to cities for use as a coolant. One metric ton of water (= one cubic meter) can store 334 million joules (MJ) or 317,000 BTUs (93 kWh). A relatively small storage facility can hold enough ice to cool a large building for a day or a week.

In addition to using ice in direct cooling applications, it is also being used in heat pump based heating systems.  In these applications, the phase change energy provides a very significant layer of thermal capacity that is near the bottom range of temperature that water source heat pumps can operate in.  This allows the system to ride out the heaviest heating load conditions and extends the timeframe by which the source energy elements can contribute heat back into the system.

Cryogenic energy storage

Cryogenic energy storage uses liquification of air or nitrogen as an energy store.

A pilot cryogenic energy system that uses liquid air as the energy store, and low-grade waste heat to drive the thermal re-expansion of the air, operated at a power station in Slough, UK in 2010.

Thermo-chemical heat storage 

Thermo-chemical heat storage (TCS) involves some kind of reversible exotherm/endotherm chemical reaction with thermo-chemical materials (TCM). Depending on the reactants, this method can allow for an even higher storage capacity than LHS.

In one type of TCS, heat is applied to decompose certain molecules. The reaction products are then separated, and mixed again when required, resulting in a release of energy. Some examples are the decomposition of potassium oxide (over a range of 300–800 °C, with a heat decomposition of 2.1 MJ/kg), lead oxide (300–350 °C, 0.26 MJ/kg) and calcium hydroxide (above 450 °C, where the reaction rates can be increased by adding zinc or aluminum). The photochemical decomposition of nitrosyl chloride can also be used and, since it needs photons to occur, works especially well when paired with solar energy.

Adsorption (or Sorption) solar heating and storage 

Adsorption processes also fall into this category. It can be used to not only store thermal energy, but also control air humidity. Zeolites (microporous crystalline alumina-silicates) and silica gels are well suited for this purpose. In hot, humid environments, this technology is often used in combination with lithium chloride to cool water.

The low cost ($200/ton) and high cycle rate (2,000×) of synthetic zeolites such as Linde 13X with water adsorbate has garnered much academic and commercial interest recently for use for thermal energy storage (TES), specifically of low-grade solar and waste heat. Several pilot projects have been funded in the EU from 2000 to the present (2020). The basic concept is to store solar thermal energy as chemical latent energy in the zeolite. Typically, hot dry air from flat plate solar collectors is made to flow through a bed of zeolite such that any water adsorbate present is driven off. Storage can be diurnal, weekly, monthly, or even seasonal depending on the volume of the zeolite and the area of the solar thermal panels. When heat is called for during the night, or sunless hours, or winter, humidified air flows through the zeolite. As the humidity is adsorbed by the zeolite, heat is released to the air and subsequently to the building space. This form of TES, with specific use of zeolites, was first taught by Guerra in 1978. Advantages over molten salts and other high temperature TES include that (1) the temperature required is only the stagnation temperature typical of a solar flat plate thermal collector, and (2) as long as the zeolite is kept dry, the energy is stored indefinitely. Because of the low temperature, and because the energy is stored as latent heat of adsorption, thus eliminating the insulation requirements of a molten salt storage system, costs are significantly lower.

Salt hydrate technology

One example of an experimental storage system based on chemical reaction energy is the salt hydrate technology. The system uses the reaction energy created when salts are hydrated or dehydrated. It works by storing heat in a container containing 50% sodium hydroxide (NaOH) solution. Heat (e.g. from using a solar collector) is stored by evaporating the water in an endothermic reaction. When water is added again, heat is released in an exothermic reaction at 50 °C (120 °F). Current systems operate at 60% efficiency. The system is especially advantageous for seasonal thermal energy storage, because the dried salt can be stored at room temperature for prolonged times, without energy loss. The containers with the dehydrated salt can even be transported to a different location. The system has a higher energy density than heat stored in water and the capacity of the system can be designed to store energy from a few months to years.

In 2013 the Dutch technology developer TNO presented the results of the MERITS project to store heat in a salt container. The heat, which can be derived from a solar collector on a rooftop, expels the water contained in the salt. When the water is added again, the heat is released, with almost no energy losses. A container with a few cubic meters of salt could store enough of this thermochemical energy to heat a house throughout the winter. In a temperate climate like that of the Netherlands, an average low-energy household requires about 6.7 GJ/winter. To store this energy in water (at a temperature difference of 70 °C), 23 m3 insulated water storage would be needed, exceeding the storage abilities of most households. Using salt hydrate technology with a storage density of about 1 GJ/m3, 4–8 m3 could be sufficient.

As of 2016, researchers in several countries are conducting experiments to determine the best type of salt, or salt mixture. Low pressure within the container seems favourable for the energy transport. Especially promising are organic salts, so called ionic liquids. Compared to lithium halide based sorbents they are less problematic in terms of limited global resources, and compared to most other halides and sodium hydroxide (NaOH) they are less corrosive and not negatively affected by CO2 contaminations.

Molecular bonds 

Storing energy in molecular bonds is being investigated. Energy densities equivalent to lithium-ion batteries have been achieved. This has been done by a DSPEC (dys-sensitized photoelectrosythesis cell). This is a cell that can store energy that has been acquired by solar panels during the day for night-time (or even later) use. It is designed by taking an indication from, well known, natural photosynthesis.

The DSPEC generates hydrogen fuel by making use of the acquired solar energy to split water molecules into its elements. As the result of this split, the hydrogen is isolated and the oxygen is released into the air. This sounds easier than it actually is. Four electrons of the water molecules need to be separated and transported elsewhere. Another difficult part is the process of merging the two separate hydrogen molecules.

The DSPEC consist out of two components: a molecule and a nanoparticle. The molecule is called a chromophore-catalyst assembly which absorbs sunlight and kick starts the catalyst. This catalyst separates the electrons and the water molecules. The nanoparticles are assembled into a thin layer and a single nanoparticle has many chromophore-catalyst on it. The function of this thin layer of nanoparticles is to transfer away the electrons which are separated from the water. This thin layer of nanoparticles is coated by a layer of titanium dioxide. With this coating, the electrons that come free can be transferred more quickly so that hydrogen could be made. This coating is, again, coated with a protective coating that strengthens the connection between the chromophore-catalyst and the nanoparticle.

Using this method, the solar energy acquired from the solar panels is converted into fuel (hydrogen) without releasing the so-called greenhouse gasses. This fuel can be stored into a fuel cell and, at a later time, used to generate electricity.

MOST 

Another promising way to store solar energy for electricity and heat production is a so called molecular solar thermal system (MOST). With this approach a molecule is converted by photoisomerization into a higher-energy isomer. Photoisomerization is a process in which one (cis-trans) isomer is converted into another by light (solar energy). This isomer is capable of storing the solar energy until the energy is released by a heat trigger or catalyst (than the isomer is converted into its original isomer). A promising candidate for such a MOST are Norbornadienes (NBD). This is because there is a high energy difference between the NBD and the quadricyclane (QC) photoisomer. This energy difference is approximately 96 kJ/mol. It is also known that for such systems, the donor-acceptor substitutions provide an effective means for redshifting the longest-wavelength absorption. This improves the solar spectrum match.

A crucial challenge for a useful MOST system is to acquire a satisfactory high energy storage density (if possible, higher than 300 kJ/kg). Another challenge of a MOST system is that light can be harvested in the visible region. The functionalization of the NBD with the donor and acceptor units is used to adjust this absorption maxima. However, this positive effect on the solar absorption is compensated by a higher molecular weight. This implies a lower energy density. This positive effect on the solar absorption has another downside. Namely that the energy storage time is lowered when the absorption is redshifted. A possible solution to overcome this anti-correlation between the energy density and the redshifting is to couple one chromophore unit to several photo switches. In this case, it is advantageous to form so called dimers or trimers. The NBD share a common donor and/or acceptor.

In a recent published article in Nature Communications, Kasper Moth-Poulsen and his team tried to engineer the stability of the high energy photo isomer by having two electronically coupled photo switches with separate barriers for thermal conversion. By doing so, a blue shift occurred after the first isomerisation (NBD-NBD to QC-NBD). This led to a higher energy of isomerisation of the second switching event (QC-NBD to QC-QC). Another advantage of this system, by sharing a donor, is that the molecular weight per norbornadiene unit is reduced. This leads to an increase of the energy density.

Eventually, this system could reach a quantum yield of photoconversion up 94% per NBD unit. A quantum yield is a measure of the efficiency of photon emission. With this system the measured energy densities reached up to 559 kJ/kg (exceeding the target of 300 kJ/kg). So, the potential of the molecular photo switches is enormous. Not only for solar thermal energy storage, but for other applications as well.

In 2022, researchers reported combining the MOST with a chip-sized thermoelectric generator to generate electricity from it. The system can reportedly store solar energy for up to 18 years and may be an option for renewable energy storage.

Electric thermal storage heaters
 
Storage heaters are commonplace in European homes with time-of-use metering (traditionally using cheaper electricity at night time). They consist of high-density ceramic bricks or feolite blocks heated to a high temperature with electricity, and may or may not have good insulation and controls to release heat over a number of hours.  Some advise not to use them in areas with young children or where there is an increased risk of fires due to poor housekeeping, both due to the high temperatures involved.

Solar energy storage

Solar energy is an application of thermal energy storage. Most practical solar thermal storage systems provide storage from a few hours to a day's worth of energy. However, a growing number of facilities use seasonal thermal energy storage (STES), enabling solar energy to be stored in summer to heat space during winter. In 2017 Drake Landing Solar Community in Alberta, Canada, achieved a year-round 97% solar heating fraction, a world record made possible by incorporating STES.

The combined use of latent heat and sensible heat are possible with high temperature solar thermal input. Various eutectic metal mixtures, such as aluminium and silicon offer a high melting point suited to efficient steam generation, while high alumina cement-based materials offer good storage capabilities.

Pumped-heat electricity storage 
In pumped-heat electricity storage (PHES), a reversible heat-pump system is used to store energy as a temperature difference between two heat stores.

Isentropic
Isentropic systems involve two insulated containers filled with e.g., crushed rock or gravel; a hot vessel storing thermal energy at high temperature/ pressure, and a cold vessel storing thermal energy at low temperature/pressure. The vessels are connected at top and bottom by pipes and the whole system is filled with an inert gas such as argon.

While charging, the system can use off-peak electricity to work as a heat pump. The compressed gas is transferred to the top of the hot vessel where it percolates down through the gravel, transferring heat to the rock and cooling to ambient temperature. The cooled, but still pressurized, gas emerging at the bottom of the vessel is then adiabatically expanded to 1 bar, which lowers its temperature to −150 °C. The cold gas is then passed up through the cold vessel where it cools the rock while warming to its initial condition.

The energy is recovered as electricity by reversing the cycle. The hot gas from the hot vessel is expanded to drive a generator and then supplied to the cold store. The cooled gas retrieved from the bottom of the cold store is compressed which heats the gas to ambient temperature. The gas is then transferred to the bottom of the hot vessel to be reheated.

The compression and expansion processes are provided by a specially designed reciprocating machine using sliding valves. Surplus heat generated by inefficiencies in the process is shed to the environment through heat exchangers during the discharging cycle.

The developer claimed that a round trip efficiency of 72–80% was achievable. This compares to >80% achievable with pumped hydro energy storage.

Another proposed system uses turbomachinery and is capable of operating at much higher power levels. Use of phase change material as heat storage material could enhance performance.

See also

 Carnot battery
 District heating
 Eutectic system
 Fireless locomotive
 Geothermal energy
 Geothermal power
 Heat capacity
 Ice storage air conditioning
 Lamm-Honigmann process
 Liquid nitrogen economy
 List of energy storage projects
 Phase change material
 Pumpable ice technology
 Steam accumulator
 Storage heater
 Thermal battery
 Uniform Mechanical Code
 Uniform Solar Energy and Hydronics Code
 US DOE International Energy Storage Database

References

External links 
 ASHRAE white paper on the economies of load shifting
 
 ICE TES Thermal Energy Storage – IDE-Tech
 Laramie, Wyoming
 "Prepared for the Thermal Energy-Storage Systems Collaborative of the California Energy Commission" Report titled "Source Energy and Environmental Impacts of Thermal Energy Storage." Tabors Caramanis & Assoc energy.ca.gov 
 Competence Center Thermal Energy Storage at Lucerne School of Engineering and Architecture

Further reading 
 Hyman, Lucas B. Sustainable Thermal Storage Systems: Planning, Design, and Operations. New York: McGraw-Hill, 2011. Print.
 Henrik Lund, Renewable Energy Systems: A Smart Energy Systems Approach to the Choice and Modeling of 100% Renewable Solutions, Academic Press 2014, .

Energy storage
Heating, ventilation, and air conditioning
Energy conservation
Heat transfer
Solar design
Renewable energy